Thủ Thiêm New Urban Area (Khu đô thị mới Thủ Thiêm) is a  urban redevelopment project in Thủ Đức City, Ho Chi Minh City. It is currently under construction.

Many local residents protest against relocations.

Location
Thủ Thiêm is situated on a point bar of the Saigon River in the municipal division known as Thủ Đức. On the opposite bank of the river are District 1—Ho Chi Minh City's central business district—District 7, and the Bình Thạnh District.

History
Before its clearance for redevelopment, Thủ Thiêm was one of the most densely settled areas of Ho Chi Minh City and included a central market established in 1751. Beginning in 2002 and continuing for almost a decade, between 14,000 and 15,000 households were removed from the development site and resettled.

Master planning for the site began in 1998, anticipating the completion of several bridges and tunnels that would connect District 2 to Ho Chi Minh City's central business district across the river. In 2003, Sasaki Associates won an international design competition to plan the site.

The project is being carried out in stages, and is scheduled to be completed in 15 years, depending on the investment capital. Priority is given to the infrastructure investors with favorable assistance for the city government as well as preferential taxation.

Urban layout

The urban area covers an area of 7 square kilometres and consists of several sections: residences, pools, parks and office sections. Almost all buildings here are to be of 10 to 40-story. Once completed, this new urban area is intended to replace District 1 as the city's center. This new urban area is connected with the existing downtown with several bridges and a 6-lane tunnel.

References

Further reading

External links
Thủ Thiêm New Urban Project PMU official website
Master Plan of Thủ Thiêm New Urban Area released, on Tuoi Tre daily (4 March 2006) (Vietnamese only)
New Urban Vietnam—A National Science Foundation-sponsored study of Thủ Thiêm and other new urban developments in Vietnam
A guide to District 2, Ho Chi Minh City – Thu Thiem New Urban Area

Populated places in Ho Chi Minh City
Buildings and structures in Ho Chi Minh City